Randolph is a city in Fremont County, Iowa, United States. The population was 189 at the time of the 2020 census. It is the birthplace of Virginia Smith, Republican U.S. representative from the 3rd District of Nebraska from 1975 until 1991.

History
Randolph was platted in 1877, shortly before the completion of the railroad through the territory. The community name was bestowed by agriculturalist Frank Peavy, who named it after Lord Randolph Churchill, father of Winston Churchill.

Geography
Randolph is located at  (40.872924, -95.566798) at the junction of Deer Creek and the West Nishnabotna River.

Demographics

2010 census
As of the census of 2010, there were 168 people, 72 households, and 50 families residing in the city. The racial makeup of the city was 98.2% White, 0.6% African American, and 1.2% from two or more races. Hispanic or Latino of any race were 0.6% of the population.

There were 72 households, of which 30.6% had children under the age of 18 living with them, 58.3% were married couples living together, 5.6% had a female householder with no husband present, 5.6% had a male householder with no wife present, and 30.6% were non-families. 23.6% of all households were made up of individuals, and 5.6% had someone living alone who was 65 years of age or older. The average household size was 2.33 and the average family size was 2.78.

The median age in the city was 47.3 years. 20.2% of residents were under the age of 18; 7.9% were between the ages of 18 and 24; 17.4% were from 25 to 44; 36.8% were from 45 to 64; and 17.9% were 65 years of age or older. The gender makeup of the city was 49.4% male and 50.6% female.

2000 census
As of the census of 2000, there were 209 people, 82 households, and 59 families residing in the city. The racial makeup of the city was 99.04% White, and 0.96% from two or more races.

There were 82 households, out of which 34.1% had children under the age of 18 living with them, 58.5% were married couples living together, 11.0% had a female householder with no husband present, and 28.0% were non-families. 23.2% of all households were made up of individuals, and 7.3% had someone living alone who was 65 years of age or older. The average household size was 2.55 and the average family size was 2.97.

28.2% are under the age of 18, 5.7% from 18 to 24, 24.4% from 25 to 44, 28.7% from 45 to 64, and 12.9% who were 65 years of age or older. The median age was 38 years. For every 100 females, there were 88.3 males. For every 100 females age 18 and over, there were 92.3 males.

The median income for a household in the city was $34,861, and the median income for a family was $36,500. Males had a median income of $27,273 versus $20,417 for females. The per capita income for the city was $13,925. About 7.6% of families and 14.3% of the population were below the poverty line, including 17.7% of those under the age of eighteen and 12.5% of those 65 or over.

Education
Fremont–Mills Community School District operates public schools.

Notable people
 Max Marshall,  Cincinnati Reds outfielder
 Anson Rood, Wisconsin politician
 Virginia D. Smith, Congresswoman from Nebraska

References

Cities in Fremont County, Iowa
Cities in Iowa